Prapretno is a settlement in the Municipality of Radeče in eastern Slovenia. It lies on the right bank of the Sava River east of Vrhovo in the historical region of Lower Carniola. The municipality is now included in the Lower Sava Statistical Region; until January 2014 it was part of the Savinja Statistical Region.

References

External links
Prapretno at Geopedia

Populated places in the Municipality of Radeče